Okhre is ward no. 1 of Ram Prasad Rai Rural Municipality in Bhojpur District in the Kosi Zone of eastern Nepal. At the time of the 1991 Nepal census, it had a population of 2729 persons living in 534 individual households. Here lies a calcium ore.

References

External links
UN map of the municipalities of Bhojpur District

Populated places in Bhojpur District, Nepal